The Academy of Sciences of Afghanistan (ASA) is the official government agency of Afghanistan that regulates the Pashto and Dari Persian languages spoken in Afghanistan. It also works with Tajikistan and Iran's official government agencies to regulate literature.

The Academy was founded in 1978 by Dr. Gul Mohammed Noorzai, a historian, writer, and linguist as a result of the merging of older academic associations. The Academy has more than 300 research fellows,   divided into three main groups: social science, natural sciences, and Islamic studies.

During years of civil war  many research institutes in Afghanistan have been destroyed. The ASA building as well lacks adequate infrastructure, laboratories, equipment and libraries.

President 
Abdul Bari Rashid, PHD (2002 - 2013]

Abdul Zahir Shakib, PhD (? - ?)
Abdul Shakoor Rashad (? - 2021)
Farid-ud-Din Mahmood, Shaykh-ul-Hadith (November 2021 - Present)

Members
Abdul Shakoor Rashad, Professor (? - 2021)

See also
 Academy of Persian Language and Literature
 Rudaki Institute of Language and Literature
 Pashto Academy

References

External links 
 Official Website in English

Government agencies of Afghanistan
Language regulators
Pashto
1978 establishments in Afghanistan
Scientific organizations established in 1978